Cameraria microphylla is a species of plant in the family Apocynaceae. It is endemic to Cuba.  It is threatened by habitat loss.

References

IUCN Red List of all current Threatened Species

Apocynaceae
Endemic flora of Cuba
Endangered flora of North America
Taxonomy articles created by Polbot